The 2010 congressional elections in Colorado were held on November 2, 2010 to determine who will represent the state of Colorado in the United States House of Representatives. Representatives are elected for two-year terms; those elected will serve in the 112th Congress.

Colorado has seven seats in the House, apportioned according to the 2000 United States Census. Its 2008-2009 congressional delegation consisted of five Democrats and two Republicans.

Overview

By district
Results of the 2010 United States House of Representatives elections in Colorado by district:

District 1

Campaign
In this heavily liberal district based in the city of Denver and some nearby suburbs, incumbent Democratic Congresswoman Diana DeGette ran for an eighth term in Congress. DeGette faced a nominal challenge in her re-election from Republican candidate Mike Fallon, Green Party candidate Gary Swing, Libertarian candidate Clint Jones, and Constitution Party candidate Chris Styskal. The Denver Post strongly endorsed DeGette for re-election, praising her for having "served [her] district well" and for being "a steady voice who has served the interests of her district and the nation." Congresswoman DeGette was heavily favored to win re-election, and on election day, she overwhelmingly won another term in Congress.

Results

District 2

Campaign
Incumbent Democratic Congressman Jared Polis ran for a second term in Congress in this liberal district based in the northwestern suburbs of Denver and several towns in the Rocky Mountains, including Vail, Grand Lake and Idaho Springs. Polis, one of the few openly gay members of Congress, ran for re-election against Republican nominee Stephen Bailey, Constitution Party candidate Jenna Goss, and Libertarian nominee Curtis Harris, and was strongly favored in the general election. As expected, Polis won by a wide margin, albeit a smaller one than this district is used to giving its Democratic representatives.

Results

District 3

Campaign
This conservative-leaning district, which encompasses all of the Western Slope and most of southern Colorado, had been represented by Democratic Congressman John Salazar, first elected in 2004 and the brother of United States Secretary of the Interior and former U.S. Senator Ken Salazar, ran for a fourth term against State Representative Scott Tipton, Salazar’s 2006 opponent. A contentious race ensued. Opponent Tipton attacked Congressman Salazar for voting for the 2009 Stimulus while Salazar retaliated that Tipton wanted to "[cut] Social Security and Medicare spending in half."

While the Denver Post praised Scott Tipton as a state lawmaker who "is knowledgeable about the issues, and touts his private sector experience," the Post endorsed Salazar for re-election, citing his "ability to work with people from differing political views to seek solutions that work for the district."

Polling

Results

District 4

Campaign
Freshman Democratic Congresswoman Betsy Markey was initially elected to Congress in 2008 by defeating incumbent Republican Congresswoman Marilyn Musgrave. Seeking a second term in this traditionally conservative district that encompasses the Eastern Plains and most of the Front Range, Congresswoman Markey was challenged by State Representative Cory Gardner, the Republican nominee, as well as Constitution Party candidate Doug Aden and independent candidate Ken Waskiewicz.

Markey, seen as a vulnerable member of Congress faced a tough challenge from Gardner. Challenger Gardner attacked Markey for supporting the 2009 Stimulus, asking rhetorically, "You want a shovel ready project we don't need? It's digging more debt," to which Markey responded, "I don't need to be lectured by someone who actually wants to tax the wind," a reference to a bill supported by Gardner in the state legislature that some claimed would allow for taxation of wind energy. Gardner further attacked Markey for a variety of votes that she supposedly cast in a television advertisement, but controversy ensued and a local Fox News affiliate yanked the ad off the air when it came to surface that the votes that Congresswoman Markey "cast" were actually cast by Massachusetts Congressman Ed Markey.

The Denver Post, citing Gardner's reputation as a "go-to guy in the legislature" and praising his motivation to bring "fiscal discipline to government," endorsed the Republican, expressing their discontent with Markey for "[straying] to the left" during her time in Congress.

Though polls indicated that Gardner held a narrow lead at best, Markey ultimately was defeated in her bid for a second term by a fairly comfortable eleven point margin of victory.

Polling

Results

District 5

Campaign
Incumbent Republican Congressman Doug Lamborn, first elected in 2006, ran for a third term in this heavily conservative district that is largely based in metro Colorado Springs. Despite the fact that Lamborn was subjected to tough Republican primaries in both 2006 and 2008, the fact that he had a clear path to the Republican nomination practically handed the general election to him, since the primary is tantamount to election here. Congressman Lamborn faced Democratic businessman Kevin Bradley, along with several independent candidates, in the general election, all of whom he was able to beat handily.

Results

District 6

Campaign
In this conservative district based in the southern suburbs of Denver and some parts of Aurora, freshman Republican Congressman Mike Coffman, who was elected to replace retiring Republican Congressman Tom Tancredo in 2008, ran for a second term. Though Democrats attempted to target Tancredo following the Columbine massacre due to the fact that Columbine High School is located in the district and Tancredo strongly supported the National Rifle Association, winning the race was clearly not a priority for the Democrats in 2010, who nominated little-known candidate John Flerlage as their candidate. Coffman won an overwhelming re-election, as expected.

Results

District 7

Campaign
In this liberal leaning district rooted in the northern, eastern, and western suburbs of Denver as well as rural portions of Adams County, incumbent Democratic Congressman Ed Perlmutter ran for a third term. Perlmutter was re-elected in a landslide two years prior, but this year, he was a target in the eyes of the National Republican Congressional Committee. Aurora City Councilman Ryan Frazier stepped up to the plate and challenged Congressman Perlmutter in the general election.

Both candidates levied heavy attacks against each other as election day drew nearer. Frazier attacked Perlmutter for supporting the 2009 Stimulus, decrying it as a waste of taxpayer money; Perlmutter provided evidence that a charter school that Frazier represented, as well as the city of Aurora, received stimulus money. In a bizarre moment during the campaign, the two candidates were discussing health care reform at a debate when Frazier pointed his hand at Perlmutter, who slapped it away, apologizing immediately thereafter.

The Denver Post, calling for "new blood in Congress," endorsed Frazier over Perlmutter, declaring that despite Frazier’s young age of 33, "his grasp on the key issues facing the country has grown considerably since he first surfaced on the political scene." The Post, meanwhile, criticized Congressman Perlmutter for being "a solid vote for the Democratic majority" and for supporting "the Obama Administration’s over-reaching agenda."

Results

References

External links
Elections Center from the Colorado Secretary of State
Official candidate list
U.S. Congress candidates for Colorado at Project Vote Smart
Colorado U.S. House from OurCampaigns.com
Campaign contributions for U.S. Congressional races in Colorado from OpenSecrets
2010 Colorado General Election graph of multiple polls from Pollster.com

House - Colorado from the Cook Political Report

Election 2010 at The Denver Post

Colorado
2010
2010 Colorado elections